Football Club Iranjavan Bushehr, commonly known as FC Iranjavan, is an Iranian football club based in Bushehr, Iran. They currently compete in the Azadegan League. The club was founded in 1942.

Iranjavan plays in a derby with fellow Bushehri side Shahin Bushehr, they also compete in a provincial derby against Pars Jonoubi Jam.

History
Iranjavan  Bushehr Football Club was founded in 1942 in Bushehr and is one of the oldest team in the province. The team competed in the provincial leagues for most of the 1990s. Iranjavan has never been promoted to the top level of Iranian football.

Season-by-season
The table below chronicles the achievements of Iranjavan in various competitions since 1990.

Club managers
  Nasser Ebrahimi (Sep 2008–Oct 09)
  Abdolrahim Khorazmi (Oct 2009–Jan 2010)
  Asghar Sharafi (Jan 2010–Jan 2011)
  Mohammad Abbasi (Jan 2011–Aug 2011)
  Abdolrahim Kharazmi (Aug 2011–Jun 2012)
  Ahmad Sanjari (Jun 2012–Jan 2013)
  Zoran Smilevski (Jan 2013–Jul 2013)
  Gholamreza Delgarm (Jul 2013–Aug 2015 ) 
  Saeed Moftakhar (Aug 2015– )

Club chairmen
  Ali vaziri
  Reza Farahmandnia

First-team squad

References

https://web.archive.org/web/20120208063844/http://www.persianleague.com/index.php/teams/teams?id=78&view=team&sid=25

External links
  Official Website
  Players and Results

Association football clubs established in 1942
Sport in Bushehr Province
1942 establishments in Iran